The following article presents a summary of the 2008-09 football season in Venezuela.

Primera División

Segunda División A

Torneo Apertura ("Opening" Tournament)

Last updated: 14 December 2008
Source: FVF
Rules for classification: 1st points; 2nd goal difference; 3rd goals scored.
P = Position; Pld = Matches played; W = Matches won; D = Matches drawn; L = Matches lost; GF = Goals for; GA = Goals against; GD = Goal difference; Pts = Points.

Torneo Clausura ("Closing" Tournament)

Last updated: 26 May 2009
Source: FVF
Rules for classification: 1st points; 2nd goal difference; 3rd goals scored.
P = Position; Pld = Matches played; W = Matches won; D = Matches drawn; L = Matches lost; GF = Goals for; GA = Goals against; GD = Goal difference; Pts = Points.

Aggregate Table

Last updated: 26 May 2009
Source: FVF
1Although the Union Atlético Trujillo qualified to the First Division, were not inscribed due to the merger with Real Esspor.
2Yaracuyanos FC bought UA Maracaibo spot.3Trujillanos FC promoted.
Rules for classification: 1st points; 2nd goal difference; 3rd goals scored.
P = Position; Pld = Matches played; W = Matches won; D = Matches drawn; L = Matches lost; GF = Goals for; GA = Goals against; GD = Goal difference; Pts = Points.

Segunda División B

Torneo Apertura ("Opening" Tournament)

Grupo Centro Oriental

Grupo Centro Occidental

Last updated: 14 December 2008
Source: FVF
Rules for classification: 1st points; 2nd goal difference; 3rd goals scored.
P = Position; Pld = Matches played; W = Matches won; D = Matches drawn; L = Matches lost; GF = Goals for; GA = Goals against; GD = Goal difference; Pts = Points.

Promotion playoff
Minasoro FC and U.A. San Antonio finished the tournament as champions of the Apertura: Grupo Centro Oriental and Grupo Centro Occidental respectively, because of this they have to play a promotion playoff.

Torneo Clausura ("Closing" Tournament)

Grupo Centro Oriental

Grupo Centro Occidental

Last updated: 10 May 2009
Source: FVF
Rules for classification: 1st points; 2nd goal difference; 3rd goals scored.
P = Position; Pld = Matches played; W = Matches won; D = Matches drawn; L = Matches lost; GF = Goals for; GA = Goals against; GD = Goal difference; Pts = Points.

Promotion playoff
Fundación Cesarger and U.A. San Antonio finished the tournament as champions of the Clausura: Grupo Centro Oriental and Grupo Centro Occidental respectively, because of this they have to play a promotion playoff.

Aggregate Table

Grupo Centro Oriental

Grupo Centro Occidental

Last updated: 10 May 2009
Source: FVF
Rules for classification: 1st points; 2nd goal difference; 3rd goals scored.
P = Position; Pld = Matches played; W = Matches won; D = Matches drawn; L = Matches lost; GF = Goals for; GA = Goals against; GD = Goal difference; Pts = Points.

Venezuela national team
This section will cover Venezuela's games from August 19, 2008 until June 27, 2009.

KEY:F = Friendly matchWCQ2010 = 2010 FIFA World Cup qualification''

References

 
Seasons in Venezuelan football